Andrew James Ronald Lindsay,  (born 25 March 1977) is a British former Olympic medal-winning rower and the CEO of Telecom Plus, which owns The Utility Warehouse.

Early life
Lindsay was educated at Eton College, where he first started rowing, and read geography at Brasenose College, Oxford. He rowed in the Oxford blue boat in The Boat Race three times, once as president of the boat club, and in The Childe of Hale, the First VIII of Brasenose College Boat Club. In 1994 he won bronze at the World Rowing Junior Championships in Munich.

Rowing career
Lindsay won a gold medal in the eight event at the 2000 Summer Olympics in Sydney, as a member of the British rowing team.

Post-retirement business career
After his Olympic success, Lindsay announced his retirement from competitive rowing and went into business. He was appointed Member of the Order of the British Empire in the 2001 New Year Honours list. He worked for Goldman Sachs UK and Ryness Electrical prior to joining Telecom Plus in 2007.

References

1977 births
Olympic rowers of Great Britain
Rowers at the 2000 Summer Olympics
Olympic gold medallists for Great Britain
Olympic medalists in rowing
People educated at St. Aubyns School
People educated at Eton College
Alumni of Brasenose College, Oxford
People associated with direct selling
Scottish male rowers
Members of the Order of the British Empire
Living people
Oxford University Boat Club rowers
People from the Isle of Skye
Medalists at the 2000 Summer Olympics
Scottish Olympic medallists